The Indian Councils Act 1892 was an Act of British Parliament that introduced various amendments to the composition and function of legislative councils in British India. Most notably, the act expanded the number of members in the central and provincial councils. For example, the number of additional members elected to the Governor-General's council was increased from twelve to sixteen members of whom – as per the Indian Councils Act 1861 – not less than half were to be non-officials, i.e. persons not in the civil or military service of the Crown. The Governor-General was empowered to invite different bodies in India to elect, select or delegate their representatives and to make 
regulations for their nomination.

After being presented to the House of Lords in 1890, the Act was passed in 1892 in response to nationalist movements beginning to surface across British India. 
This scheme would be overturned by passage of the Indian Councils Act 1909 – also called the Morley-Minto reforms – which introduced indirect elections to Indian councils along with special electoral preferences for muslim minorities and various commercial and functional interests.

Membership 
Under the regulations adopted, the Governor-General's council was to consist of nine ex-officio members (the Governor-General, six members of the Executive Council, the Commander-in-Chief, and the head of the province in which the council met), six official additional members and ten non-official members of the Legislative Councils of Bengal, Bombay, Madras and the Northwestern province. When Legislative Councils were established in Punjab and Burma, one member each was returned from these also. In conjunction with the ex-officio members, the official members constituted a majority.

Similar changes were introduced in the composition of provincial legislative Councils. In all the provinces – with some exception in Bombay – an official majority, while not required by statute, was maintained.

While the Central Legislative Council was expanded to include between 10 and 16 Additional Members, specifics in provinces varied: Bombay came to have 8 Additional Members; Madras 20; Bengal 20; Northwestern Province & Oudh 15. 

The universities, district board, municipalities, zamindars and chambers of commerce were empowered to recommend members to provincial councils. While such recommendations could theoretically be rejected, in practice, they were not refused. Thus, while failing to answer calls for direct elections, .

Council powers 
In addition to these changes, the Act relaxed restrictions imposed by the Indian Councils Act 1861 in allowing councils to discuss – but not vote on – each year's annual financial statement. Councilors could also put questions within certain limits to the government on the matter of public interest after giving six days' notice, but none of them had the right to ask supplementary questions.

See also
Indian National Congress
British Committee of the Indian National Congress
William Wedderburn
Dadabhai Naoroji
Indian Councils Act 1909

Notes

References

Sources 
 
 

United Kingdom Acts of Parliament 1892
Acts of the Parliament of the United Kingdom concerning India
1892 in India